Al Souk Al Kabir, also referred to as Souk Al Kabir or Meena Bazaar, is a community in Dubai, United Arab Emirates (UAE). Al Souk Al Kabir is located in the area of Bur Dubai and is one of the oldest residential areas in the city with a predominantly South Asian population, restaurants and shops. The locality, referred to as Meena Bazaar by the local Pakistani and Indian community, also encompasses the historic Al Bastakiya district of Dubai.

Al Souk Al Kabir, literally meaning The Big Market, saw an influx of traders from India in the early 20th century who eventually settled in the area.

Important landmarks in Al Souk Al Kabir include the Al Bastakiya district, Al Fahidi Fort, Dubai Museum, Bank of Baroda and the Hindu temple of Dubai.

History 

Bur Dubai (in Arabic: بر دبي) translates to 'Mainland Dubai' and is the oldest historical neighborhood of Dubai. Al Souq Al Khabir (Meena Bazaar) is located in the north of the area, close to Dubai Creek. The Bani Yas tribe settled here in the 19th century, whom were of Najdi origin in modern-day Saudi Arabia. Dubai creek served as a minor port for dhows, a traditional wooden boat, coming from India and East Africa. This area also played an important part in Dubai's pearl and fishing industry.

Modern times 
The area is well known for its many textile shops and markets, predominantly selling South Asian fashion and accessories. Amongst the majority of textile shops are tailors, gold shops, electronics and other small businesses. There are also various food outlets, restaurants and cafes.

Two key roads called Cosmos Lane, its original name since the early 1970s, before becoming more popularly named 'Meena Bazaar' and Al Fahidi Street attract shoppers.

References 

Communities in Dubai
Pakistani diaspora in the United Arab Emirates